Peter Derek Vaughan Prince (14 August 1915 – 24 September 2003) was a Bible teacher whose daily radio programme, Derek Prince Legacy Radio, is broadcast around the world in various languages.

Marriage and the growth of his ministry
Derek Prince worked at the Faith Tabernacle in Chicago, and then moved to Good News Church in Ft. Lauderdale, Florida. In May 1971 Derek Prince Publications opened offices in Ft. Lauderdale, Florida. Derek Prince Publications became Derek Prince Ministries in December 1990.

The Princes traveled extensively in ministry until his wife Ruth died on 29 December 1998. The following list of countries covers their ministry from 1993 to 1998. Some of these countries were visited more than once: Russia, Germany, Kazakhstan, Hungary, South Africa, Kenya, Indonesia, Malaysia, Singapore, Turkey, Poland, Bahrain, Cuba, Colombia, Switzerland, France, Portugal, India and England.

He is the author of 51 books, 600 audio and 100 videos, many of which has been translated and published in more than 60 languages. Some of the subjects that are covered in his teachings are prayer and fasting, foundations of the Christian faith, spiritual warfare, God's love and marriage and family. His daily radio is translated into Arabic, Chinese (Amoy, Cantonese, Mandarin, Shanghainese, Swatow), Croatian, German, Malagasy, Mongolian, Russian, Tamil, Samoan, Spanish, Bahasa Indonesia, Tongan, Telugu, Malayalam, Kannada, Hindi and many other languages. The radio program continues to reach many people around the world.

Derek Prince Ministries continued for the rest of his life to distribute his teachings and to train missionaries, church leaders, and congregations.

Demons and deliverance
As a Pentecostal, Prince believed in the reality of spiritual forces operating in the world, and of the power of demons to cause illness and psychological problems. While in Seattle, he was asked to perform an exorcism on a woman, and he came to believe that Christians could be "demonized" (normally described as "possessed" by demons - Prince avoided this term which implies 'ownership'). This was at odds with the more usual Pentecostal view that demons could "possess" unbelievers, but could only "oppress" Christians. Prince believed that his deliverance ministry used the power of God to defeat demons.

Israel

Prince strongly opposed replacement theology. His book The Destiny of Israel and the Church argues that the Church has not replaced Israel and that the covenant that God made with the nation of Israel still stands today. Prince also believed that the creation of the state of Israel was the fulfillment of biblical prophecy. Derek states in his book Promised Land, "The central theme of biblical prophecy, as it is being unfolded in our time, revolves around the land and the people of Israel. God is carrying out His predetermined plan to regather the Jewish people from their worldwide dispersion and restore them to their ancient homeland."

The Shepherding Movement
Prince created the Shepherding Movement with fellow ministers Don Basham, Bob Mumford, Charles Simpson and Ern Baxter, who became known as the 'Fort Lauderdale Five.' They sought to counter what were seen as excesses within the Charismatic Movement, by emphasizing discipleship and pastoral care. The practice of 'personal submission to spiritual authorities' was considered controversial. Prince's association with the Shepherding Movement provided international exposure. After leaving the movement, he focused on his own international ministry.

Publications
Prince published many books and recorded over 600 audio teaching sermons and 100 video teachings.

His books include:

 The Foundations Series (1966)
 Praying for the Government (1970)
 Shaping History Through Prayer and Fasting (1973)
 Appointment in Jerusalem (1975)
 Faith to Live By (1977)
 The Grace of Yielding (1977)
 Marriage Covenant (1978)
 Promised Land (1982)
 The Last Word on the Middle East (1982)
 God Is a Matchmaker (1986)
 Blessing or Curse: You Can Choose (1990)
 The Destiny of Israel and the Church (1992)
 Does Your Tongue Need Healing? (1992)
 God's Remedy for Rejection (1993)
 Protection from Deception (1996)
 They Shall Expel Demons: What You Need to Know about Demons - Your Invisible Enemies (1998)
 Who is the Holy Spirit? (1999)
 Husbands and Fathers (2000)
 Judging: When? Why? How? (2001)
 Through the Psalms with Derek Prince (2002)
 Transformed for Life: How to Know God Better and Love Him More (2002)
 War in Heaven: God's Epic Battle with Evil (2003)
 Rules of Engagement: Preparing for Your Role in the Spiritual Battle (2006)
 Entering the Presence of God: Moving Beyond Praise and Thanksgiving to True Worship (2006)
 Bought with Blood (2007, previously published in 2000 under the title Atonement, Your Appointment with God)
 Prophetic Guide to the End Times (2008)
 Secrets of a Prayer Warrior (2009)
 Lucifer Exposed: The Devil's Plans to Destroy Your Life (2016)

Bibliography
Stephen Mansfield, Derek Prince: A Biography (Charisma House, 2005).
Obituary in King's College Cambridge Annual Report, 2004.

See also
Christian Zionism in the United Kingdom

Notes

External links 
Derek Prince Ministries, International
Derek Prince Ministries USA
Derek Prince Ministries Australia
Derek Prince Ministries NZ
Derek Prince Ministries UK
Derek Prince Ministries Singapore

1915 births
2003 deaths
20th-century evangelicals
21st-century evangelicals
Alumni of King's College, Cambridge
American evangelicals
Arminian theologians
Arminian writers
British Christian Zionists
Christian clergy from Bangalore
English evangelicals
English Pentecostals
English Protestant missionaries
Faith healers
Fellows of King's College, Cambridge
Pentecostal missionaries
People educated at Eton College
Royal Army Medical Corps soldiers